Manggar is a town in the Indonesian province of Bangka-Belitung, Indonesia which is a port on the east coast of Belitung Island, and is the seat of the East Belitung Regency. The town was founded as a tin mining town in the 19th century.

History
In the 1860s, Dutch prospectors of the Billiton Maatschappij explored the area and established the mining district of Burung Mandi Lenggang. In 1863, a tin mine was established on the right banks of the Manggar River, and the district was renamed to Manggar district in 1866. Manggar was opened to immigration of foreign orientals on 8 October 1871, which is selected as the establishment date for the district.

In late 1945, during the early stages of the Indonesian National Revolution, Dutch authorities reoccupied the town although they encountered some resistance from the newly formed Indonesian Armed Forces. After Indonesian independence, the Manggar District was one of the four districts comprising the island of Belitung by the 1980s. Manggar became the seat of the East Belitung Regency after its formation in 2003.

Demographics
39,135 people lived in Manggar at the 2020 Census - making it the most populous district in East Belitung and the second most populated in the island behind Tanjung Pandan. The sex ratio is 104.5 males to 100 females.

Administration
The district of Manggar is further subdivided into nine villages. Out of these, three - Kelubi, Buku Limau and Bentaian Jaya - are classified by Statistics Indonesia as "rural"  (desa), while the rest are "urban"  (kelurahan).

Notable people
 Yusril Ihza Mahendra (born 1956), lawyer and national politician.
 Basuki Tjahaja Purnama (born 1966), Governor of Jakarta (2014-2017).

References

Populated places in the Bangka Belitung Islands
Regency seats of the Bangka Belitung Islands
Populated places established in 1871
1871 establishments in the Dutch East Indies
Districts of the Bangka Belitung Islands